Woodson Michel is a Haitian-American singer, songwriter, record producer and actor. In the last few years since 2010, he has released singles, music videos and albums.

Musical career
Woodson interest in music was inspired by the likes of Prince, R. Kelly, Dru Hill and Michael Jackson. His career started with a group called Lowkey, consisting of Maurice Hampton and Ralph G. Lowkey, releasing two singles. Woodson worked with producer Marc Celestin Jr., who produced his album called, "Your Night." He has worked with Ken Schmidt for his videos "Whine", "Pop Pop", and "She’s Hot." Woodson's single "Let Me Be," was featured on the Digital Radio Tracking Chart sitting at #148 (out of 200) on the first week of August 2013.

Discography

Album
Your Night (2010)

Singles
Her -2010
She's hot ft.: Mighty Mystic -2010
Whine ft.: Axis -2010
Pop Pop ft: Bizzy boy
Killing Me: -2012
AEIOU: -2013
Dancing & Sexing: -2014

References

External links
Woodson Michel on Twitter

1981 births
Living people
American child singers
Child pop musicians
American hip hop singers
Singers from Los Angeles
Haitian emigrants to the United States
21st-century American singers